Pamela Margaret McConnell (February 14, 1946 – July 7, 2017) was a Canadian politician who served on Toronto City Council. She was first elected to the Metro Toronto Council in 1994, representing a series of downtown Toronto wards until 2017. She served as a deputy mayor of Toronto, representing Toronto and East York from 2014 to 2017.

McConnell was a teacher before entering politics. She was elected as a public school trustee in 1982 and held that position until she was elected to Metro Council in 1994. After the amalgamation of Toronto, she was elected to the new city council, serving from 1998 until her death in 2017.

McConnell received an award from the Duke of Edinburgh in 1997 for her work with inner city youth, and received the Queen's Diamond Jubilee Medal in 2013. The Pam McConnell Young Women in Leadership Award was created in 2018 for women between the ages of 19 and 26. In addition, the Pam McConnell Aquatic Center in Toronto is named after her. The Federation of Canadian Municipalities (FCM) created the Award for Gender Equality in International Development and named it the Pam McConnell Award.

Early life
McConnell was born on February 14, 1946, in England; her family emigrated to Canada in 1954 when she was 9 years old. She was a teacher before entering politics by being elected as a Toronto Board of Education school trustee in 1982. She held that position until 1994. She played a prominent role in advocating for adult literacy programs. In 1988, she became vice-chair of the Toronto School Board and, in 1992, became its chair.

Political career
In 1994, she left the school board and was elected to Metro Toronto Council in a close race. With the amalgamation of Toronto with five suburban municipalities in 1997, she was forced into a tough election. With wards electing two councillors each, she faced fellow New Democratic Party (NDP) incumbents Jack Layton and Peter Tabuns, edging out Tabuns for the second councillor position by just over two hundred votes. With Tabuns and Layton nominated as the "official" NDP candidates by the ward's NDP association, McConnell's decision to run caused her to be estranged from her fellow New Democrats for a period, and she supported Liberal-backed Barbara Hall as a candidate for Mayor of Toronto in the 2003 municipal election against New Democrat David Miller.

She maintained her membership in the NDP, however, and became more active with the party since 2003. She was a Miller ally since the election and, served as chair of the Toronto Police Services Board from 2004 to 2005 overseeing the selection of a new Toronto police chief Bill Blair. She also served as vice-chair of the board.

McConnell has also been an advocate of children's issues on city council.

McConnell served as a member of Toronto City Council for Ward 28 from its creation in 2000, and was re-elected every term until her death. In November 2013, she briefly became a subject of national and international news coverage when Mayor Rob Ford, during council debate on November 18 around him of discretionary powers following his drug use scandal, got up out of his chair and began to run in the council chamber, bumping into McConnell and knocking her to the ground.

McConnell is credited for her role in advocating poverty reduction and the Regent Park revitalization. She championed the development of an aquatic centre in Regent Park. Two million dollars of the cost the new centre was directed through section 37 funding (a part of the Planning Act which allows the city to recieve community benefiting funding from developers) from the construction of the Trump International Hotel and Tower. In a 2012 interview, Donald Trump described McConnell as a "tough negotiator" and a "terrific representant for her district", and credited her for securing the funding for the centre from his development.

Following the 2014 Toronto municipal election, new mayor John Tory appointed McConnell as one of four deputy mayors representing the city, and in 2015 he selected her as the champion of the city's poverty reduction strategy. McConnell is credited for her role in advocating poverty reduction and the revitalization of the Regent Park neighbourhood.

Awards and honors
McConnell received an award from the Duke of Edinburgh in 1997 for her work with inner city youth. In 2013, she received the Queen's Diamond Jubilee Medal in recognition of her decades of public service. In January 2018, Toronto Mayor John Tory announced the creation of the Pam McConnell Young Women in Leadership Award for women between the ages of 19 and 26. In June 2018, the Federation of Canadian Municipalities posthumously awarded McConnell a place in its Roll of Honour, as well as created the Pam McConnell International Award for Gender Equity, to recognize "the contributions of a Canadian municipal expert to the advancement and promotion of gender equality in FCM's programs." In July 2018, Toronto City Council voted to name the city's aquatic centre in Regent Park after McConnell, the Pam McConnell Aquatic Centre was a key development that McConnell advocated for while serving on council.

Personal life
McConnell had two daughters, Heather Ann and Madelyn, with her husband Jim. On July 6, 2017, McConnell was reportedly in hospital and was referred to as "gravely ill" by Mayor John Tory. She died on July 7, 2017, from a lung condition.

Election results

References

External links

 Personal website (Archived from July 7, 2015)

1946 births
2017 deaths
20th-century Canadian politicians
20th-century Canadian women politicians
21st-century Canadian politicians
21st-century Canadian women politicians
Canadian schoolteachers
Chairs of the Toronto Police Services Board
Deaths from lung disease
English emigrants to Canada
Metropolitan Toronto councillors
People from Carlisle, Cumbria
Toronto city councillors
Toronto District School Board trustees
Women in Ontario politics
Women municipal councillors in Canada